Yako is a town in northern Burkina Faso, the capital of Passoré Province. Yako is known for its large mosque and as the birthplace of former President Thomas Sankara.

Climate
Köppen-Geiger climate classification system classifies its climate as hot semi-arid (BSh).

References

Populated places in the Nord Region (Burkina Faso)
Passoré Province